VC Marek Union-Ivkoni is a professional men's volleyball team, based in Dupnitsa. VC Marek Union-Ivkoni plays in the Bulgarian League, Bulgarian Cup and the European Champions League.

Honors

Champions 4 times: 
   2012, 2013, 2014, 2015

Cup winners 1 times:
  2013

Dupnitsa
Bulgarian volleyball clubs